João Gomes de Oliveira commonly known as Filhão (born 16 June 1995) is an Angolan professional footballer who plays as a forward for Recreativo do Libolo.

In 2018–19, he signed in for Recreativo do Libolo in Angola's premier league, the Girabola.

References

External links 
 

1995 births
Living people
Angolan footballers
Angola international footballers
Atlético Petróleos de Luanda players
C.R. Caála players
C.R.D. Libolo players
Estrela Clube Primeiro de Maio players
Kabuscorp S.C.P. players
Sporting Clube de Cabinda players
SuperSport United F.C. players

Association football forwards